Marco Andrés Olea Hueche (born 24 March 1979) is a former Chilean footballer and current manager.

Coaching career
From April to July 2021, he coached Santiago Morning (women). On second half 2022, he assumed as the manager of Cultural Maipú in the Tercera B, the fifth level of the Chilean football league system.

Personal life
From his maternal line, Olea is of Mapuche descent, since his last surname, Hueche (or Weche), means "young" in Mapudungun. 

As a footballer, he was nicknamed El Caballero del Gol (The Gentleman of the Goal) due to the fact that he used to put on a tie to celebrate his goals since he played for Universidad de Concepción.
  
He has stated that cooking is also his passion. So, he took part in the first season of the cooking TV show Master Chef Chile in 2014.

Honours

Club
Universidad de Chile
 Primera División de Chile (1): 2004 Apertura

Deportes Iquique
 Copa Chile: 2010
 Primera B: 2010

Individual
 Primera B Top-Scorer: 1999

References

External links
 
 

1979 births
Living people
People from Temuco
Chilean people of Mapuche descent
Mapuche sportspeople
Chilean footballers
Chilean expatriate footballers
Chilean Primera División players
Primera B de Chile players
Segunda División Profesional de Chile players
Ascenso MX players
Audax Italiano footballers
Provincial Osorno footballers
Universidad de Concepción footballers
Universidad de Chile footballers
O'Higgins F.C. footballers
Everton de Viña del Mar footballers
Cobresal footballers
Lobos BUAP footballers
Club Deportivo Palestino footballers
Deportes Iquique footballers
Deportes Copiapó footballers
Puerto Montt footballers
Chilean expatriate sportspeople in Mexico
Expatriate footballers in Mexico
Association football forwards
Chilean football managers
Indigenous sportspeople of the Americas
20th-century Mapuche people
21st-century Mapuche people